The Caribbean Cruise Caper is the 154th book of The Hardy Boys Mystery Stories by Franklin W. Dixon, published in 1999.

Plot summary
Frank and Joe Hardy go on a Caribbean mystery cruise.  The cruise allows teenage detectives to solve simulated crimes with the Hardy Boys as judges.

However, someone onboard soon puts the ship in peril.  Frank and Joe, with the help of the young detectives, must find the culprit before the ship sinks.

References

The Hardy Boys books
1999 American novels
1999 children's books
Novels set on ships
Novels set in the Caribbean